Henry Fanshawe may refer to:

 Henry Fanshawe (1506–1568), English politician, MP for Kingston upon Hull and Queen's Remembrancer
 Henry Fanshawe (1569–1616), English politician, MP for Westbury and Boroughbridge and Queen's Remembrancer
 Henry Fanshawe (1634–1685), English politician, MP for Penryn